Frank Chiarelli is a retired Canadian ice hockey player. He captained Rensselaer to its first National Title in 1954 and was the all-time NCAA leader in career goals at the time of his graduation.

Career
Like many Canadian players of the era Chiarelli began his college career in 1951 as an over-aged freshman. He played for Rensselaer despite the NCAA having a policy restricting all players to 3 years of varsity play and had an immediate impact for the Engineers. In just 18 games Chiarelli scored 55 goals, breaking the NCAA single-season record and became the first freshman to lead the NCAA in both goals and points. Rensselaer's hockey program improved immensely in his first season, going from 5–10 the year before to 15–3, however the team only managed to finish second in the Tri-State League and missed out on the NCAA tournament.

In his sophomore season Chiarelli's scoring declined but the team was able to finish atop their conference and make the first NCAA appearance in school history. The Engineers were predicted to finish in the bottom two but performed well against Minnesota in the semifinal (losing 2-3) before winning the consolation game. The next year Chiarelli was named as the team captain and while his numbers dipped again the team tied St. Lawrence for the Tri-State League title and the NCAA committee surprisingly tabbed RPI to go to the tournament. In his final attempt at an NCAA championship Chiarelli led RPI against three-time defending champion Michigan and pulled off one of the biggest upsets in tournament history. The following night in their first championship appearance, Rensselaer was facing a Minnesota team that had just set an NCAA record with a 14-1 win in their semifinal game. The veteran Rensselaer team was not deterred, however, and scored the first three goals of the game, including one from Chiarelli. Minnesota came storming back with four consecutive goals and with time winding down Chiarelli slid the puck to Abbie Moore who tied the game with under 4 minutes to play. The Engineers came out firing in the overtime and, after Minnesota weathered a barrage from Chiarelli's line, Rensselaer's second unit scored the game-winner and produced one of the most improbable championship runs in NCAA history.

Chiarelli played in 19 of Rensselaer's 22 games in his senior season, the fourth consecutive where's both his goal and point totals diminished, but by the end of the 1954–55 season Chiarelli's 155 career goals were an NCAA record. The mark would only stand for five seasons but as of 2019 Chiarelli still has the third-most goals of any NCAA player ever and sits second in terms of goals per game and points per game (behind only Phil Latreille). After graduating Chiarelli played for the Wembley Lions of the short-lived British National League. He then played for three teams over three season in the Ontario Senior League before ending his career with 63 games for the Hull-Ottawa Canadiens in another short-lived league, the EPHL.

Personal life
Frank's son Peter Chiarelli played college hockey at Harvard before going onto a long career as an executive in the NHL.

Career statistics

Awards and honors

References

External links 
 

1931 births
Living people
Canadian ice hockey forwards
Ice hockey people from Ottawa
RPI Engineers men's ice hockey players
Wembley Lions players
NCAA men's ice hockey national champions
AHCA Division I men's ice hockey All-Americans